The East Central Conference is a high school athletic conference of teams in the East Central Wisconsin area. The ECC was founded in 1970 and originally disbanded in 2007. The conference was revived for the 2015-2016 school year, the result of a realignment within the Wisconsin Interscholastic Athletic Association.

Members

Current members

Former Members

History

1970-2007
The ECC was founded in 1970 with Berlin, Hortonville, New London, Omro, Ripon, Waupaca, Weyauwega and Winneconne as the original members. In 1973, Weyauwega left for the Central Wisconsin Conference (CWC) and was replaced by former CWC member Little Chute the following year. In 1979, New London left to join the Bay Conference in exchange for former CWC member Wautoma. In 1995, Waupun joined for football only as Wautoma transferred to the Flyway Conference for football. In 1999, Hortonville, Little Chute and Waupaca joined the newly formed Valley 8 Conference, while Waupun became a full-time member. That year, Laconia and Markesan also joined the conference. In 2001, the ECC merged with the Flyway Conference. The conference was briefing named the East Central-Flyway Conference and consisted of two divisions: the Rivers and the Lakes. The conference was restructured again in 2006 as the Flyway Conference split with the ECC. The conference was fully disbanded in 2007 with four of the remaining ECC teams joining former Valley 8 Conference teams to form the Eastern Valley Conference.

Revival 2015-Present

During the realignment of several conferences within northeastern Wisconsin, eight schools were joined to form a new conference. Members included: Berlin, Campellsport, Kewaskum, Kettle Moraine Lutheran, Plymouth, Ripon, Waupun and Winneconne. The members choose to name the new conference the East Central Conference as several members were once part of the original ECC.

East Central-Flyway Lakes/Rivers Division

In 2001, the conference merged with the Wisconsin Flyway Conference to form the East Central-Flyway. At that time, the conference was split into two divisions: the Lakes and the Rivers. The divisions were in place until 2006 when several teams moved to different conferences.

Lakes

Berlin
Omro
Oshkosh Lourdes  
Laconia
Markesan
Ripon
Waupun 
Wautoma
Winneconne

Rivers

Horicon 
Lomira
North Fond du Lac 
St. Mary's Springs 
Winnebago Lutheran Academy
Mayville
Oakfield
Central Wisconsin Christian
St. Lawrence Seminary

Mayville played in the Lakes for Football along with Springs for a few years. Markesan & Laconia also played in the Rivers only for Football only but in the lakes for all other Sports.

References

Organizations disestablished in 2007
Sports organizations established in 1970
Wisconsin high school sports conferences